Michael Adas (born 4 February 1943 in Detroit, Michigan) is an American historian and currently the Abraham E. Voorhees Professor of History at Rutgers University. He specializes in the history of technology, the history of anticolonialism and in global history.

Background
Michael Adas was born in 1943 to Harold A., and Elizabeth Rivard Adas. He attended Western Michigan University (Kalamazoo, MI), where he graduated summa cum laude in 1965. He then went to the University of Wisconsin - Madison for his graduate schooling where he earned two M.A. degrees, History (1967) and Indian Studies (1968), as well as his Ph.D in 1971. In the same year that he earned his M.A. degree in Indian studies he married Jane Hampton on June 18, 1967.

In 1971, Adas joined Rutgers University as an Assistant Professor and steadily rose through the ranks, becoming a full Professor in 1978. In 1996, Michael Adas received dual honors and was promoted to Rutgers University Board of Governors' Professor and received the Abraham E. Voorhees Chair in History. In addition, Michael Adas is a member of the Association for Asian Studies and the American Association of History Professors.

Awards
At Rutgers University, Adas won the John Simon Guggenheim Fellow Award in 1984 and the Warren Susman Teaching Award in 1987. He won the NJ-NEH Book Award in 1990, and the Dexter Prize in 1991 for Machines as the Measure of Men. In 1992, he won the Teacher of the Year Award.

Career timeline
(Editor) Islamic and European Expansion: The Forging of a Global Order, Temple University Press (Philadelphia, PA), 1993.
(Coauthor with Peter N. Stearns and Stuart B. Schwartz) Turbulent Passage: A Global History of the Twentieth Century, HarperCollins (New York, NY), 1994.
(Editor) Technology and European Overseas Enterprise: Diffusion, Adaption, and Adoption, Variorum (Brookfield, VT), 1996.
State, Market, and Peasant in Colonial South and Southeast Asia, Ashgate (Brookfield, VT), 1998.
(Coeditor with Steven Adams and Kevin Reilly) World History: Selected Course Outlines and Reading Lists from American Colleges and Universities, Markus Wiener (Princeton, NJ), 1998.
(Coauthor with Peter N. Stearns and Stuart B. Schwartz) World Civilizations: The Global Experience, HarperCollins (New York, NY), 1992, 3rd edition, Longman (New York, NY), 2000.
(Editor) Agricultural and Pastoral Societies in Ancient and Classical History, Temple University Press (Philadelphia, PA), 2001.
Adas, Michael, "The Paradox of Exceptionalism: Contested Visions of the American Experience and its Place in the Global History of Humankind". In Comparing Nationalism and Citizenship of the United States and Japan. Edited by Chieko Kitagawa Otsuru. Japan Center for Area Studies: National Museum of Ethnology, 2001.
Adas, Michael, "From Avoidance to Confrontation: Peasant Protest in Pre-colonial and Colonial Southeast Asia". In Colonialism and Culture. Edited by Nicholas B. Dirks. Ann Arbor: The University of Michigan Press, 2001: 89–126.
Adas, Michael, "Contested Hegemony: The Great War and the Afro-Asian Assault on the Civilizing Mission Ideology". Journal of World History, 2004: 31–64.
Dominance by Design: Technological Imperatives and America's Civilizing Mission, Cambridge, Massachusetts: Belknap Press of Harvard University Press, 2006.
Contributor of articles and reviews to Journal of Southeast Asian Studies, Journal of Asian Studies, Journal of Asian History, Journal of Economic History, and Journal of Social History.
Currently teaches at Rutgers University, 2010.

Works
The Burma Delta. Economic Development and Social Change on an Asian Rice Frontier, 1852–1941, Madison, Wisconsin: Univ. of Wisconsin Press, 1974
Prophets of Rebellion: Millenarian Protest Movements against the European Colonial Order, Univ. N. Carolina Press, 1979
Machines as the Measure of Men: Science, Technology, and Ideologies of Western Dominance, Ithaca [etc.]: Cornell Univ. Pr., 1989, Paperback edition: , review
"The paradox of exceptionalism: Contested visions of the American experience and its place in the global history of humankind". In: Comparing Nationalism and Citizenship of the United States and Japan; 5 (Tokyo): 2001.01.10, ed. by Chieko Kitagawa Otsuru,  Suita: Japan Center for Area Studies, National Museum of Ethnology, 2001
"From avoidance to confrontation: Peasant protest in precolonial and colonial Southeast Asia". In: Colonialism and Culture, ed. by Nicholas B. Dirks,  Ann Arbor: The Univ. of Michigan Press, 2001, 89–126.
"Contested Hegemony: The Great War and the Afro-Asian Assault on the Civilizing Mission Ideology".  In: Journal of World History 15/1 (2004): 31–64.
Dominance by Design: Technological Imperatives and America's Civilizing Mission, Cambridge, Mass.: Belknap Press of Harvard Univ. Press, 2006
(with Peter Stearns and Stuart Schwartz) Turbulent Passage: A Global History of the 20th Century, Longman, 4th edition 2008

References

1943 births
Living people
Historians of technology
University of Wisconsin–Madison College of Letters and Science alumni
Rutgers University faculty
21st-century American historians
21st-century American male writers
Western Michigan University alumni
Academics from Michigan
People from Detroit
Historians from Michigan
American male non-fiction writers